The Ondo State House of Assembly is the legislative branch of the Ondo State Government inaugurated on February 3, 1979.
The assembly is unicameral with 26 representatives elected from each constituencies of the 18 local government area of the state.
In 2011, the assembly consists of two political parties, LP and the PDP but the assembly was dominated by the Labour party with a total number of 25 representative and the PDP with only one representative.
In October 2015, all members of the assembly defected to the PDP following the defection of Olusegun Mimiko, the governor of the state who was re-elected on May 29, 2011 following the April 11, 2011 election.
Presently, the Assembly comprises 23 members of the PDP  and 2 members of the APC with a vacant seat.

Presiding officer
The incumbent Speaker is Bamidele Oleyelogun who succeeded the first female speaker of the Assembly, Jumoke Akindele .

Current House Of Assembly Member

References

1976 establishments in Nigeria
State lower houses in Nigeria